The 1943 South American Basketball Championship was the 11th edition of regional tournament.  It was held in Lima, Peru and won by the Argentina national basketball team.  6 teams, including Bolivia in their first appearance, competed despite the World War that was currently under way.

Final rankings

Results

Preliminary round

Each team played the other five teams once, for a total of five games played by each team and 15 overall in the preliminary round.  Placing in the top four qualified a team to move on to the final round.

Final round

The top four teams advanced to the final round, where they played each of the other three once.  Only the results from this round were used to determine final placing for the top four.

Argentina line-up: Candido Arrua (Santa Fe), Jose Alberto Beltran (Capital Federal), Carlos Jensen Buhl (Capital Federal), Julio Carrasco (Santa Fe), Gustavo Chazarreta (Stgo del Estero), Mario Jimenez (Stgo del Estero), Rafael Lledo (Stgo del Estero), Italo Malvicini (Santa Fe), Marcelino Ojeda (Corrientes), Hector Romagnolo (Capital Federal), Carlos Sanchez (Stgo del Estero), Oscar Serena (Santa Fe). Coach: Saul Ramirez Manfredi.

External links

FIBA.com archive for SAC1943

1943
S
B
1943 in Peruvian sport
Sports competitions in Lima
Champ
1940s in Lima
May 1943 sports events